Sergio Pérez Jaén (born 20 June 1997) is a Spanish professional footballer who plays for CD El Ejido as a left winger.

Club career
Pérez was born in Gerena, Seville, Andalusia, and was an AD San José youth graduate. On 21 November 2014 he joined Segunda División B side Lucena CF, and made his senior debut the following 26 April by playing 26 minutes in a 0–6 away loss against Real Betis B.

In November 2015, Pérez moved to Recreativo de Huelva and returned to youth football. He was promoted to the reserves in July of the following year, and scored his first senior goals on 4 September by netting a brace in a 3–0 home win against CD San Roque.

On 16 July 2017 Pérez moved to another reserve team, UD Almería B in the fourth division. He made his first-team debut on 17 August of the following year, coming on as a late substitute for Joaquín Arzura in a 0–1 away loss against Cádiz CF in the Segunda División.

Pérez scored his first professional goal on 18 October 2018, netting the opener in a 3–1 home defeat of CF Reus Deportiu in the season's Copa del Rey. On 16 August of the following year, he moved to Cádiz on a two-year contract and was assigned to the B-side also in the third division.

On 20 August 2020, Pérez agreed to a deal with CD El Ejido, still in division three.

Personal life
Pérez's younger brother, Perotti, is also a footballer and plays for Sevilla's U-19 team as a winger.

References

External links

1997 births
Living people
People from Sierra Norte (Seville)
Sportspeople from the Province of Seville
Spanish footballers
Footballers from Andalusia
Association football wingers
Segunda División players
Segunda División B players
Tercera División players
Lucena CF players
Atlético Onubense players
UD Almería B players
UD Almería players
Cádiz CF B players
Cádiz CF players
CD El Ejido players